Saint Maurus may refer to:

Saint Maurus, the first disciple of St. Benedict of Nursia
Saint Maurus of Parentium, the first Bishop of Parentium and the patron saint of Poreč
Saint Maurus of Pécs, the second Bishop of Pécs and the first known local prelate in the Kingdom of Hungary
Victor Maurus, soldier martyred in Rome under Maximian (ca. 303)
Maurus of Glanfeuil